Banshū or Banshu may refer to:

 Banshū, another name for Iwaki Province.

 Banshū, another name for Harima Province.